Carlos Julio Ramírez (4 August 1916 in Tocaima, Cundinamarca – 12 December 1986 in Miami) was a Colombian baritone who became a MGM Studios contract actor in Hollywood during the 1940s.

Filmography

References

External links
 

1916 births
1986 deaths
20th-century Colombian opera singers
20th-century Colombian male actors
Colombian male film actors
Baritones
People from Cundinamarca Department
Colombian emigrants to the United States
Metro-Goldwyn-Mayer contract players